This is a list of Boundary Peaks of the Alaska–British Columbia border, including those on the Alaska–Yukon border, being those peaks named as border-points of the Canada–United States border as a result of the Alaska Boundary Settlement of 1903 and associated later surveys.

Brass or concrete survey markers  were placed on the summits of the accessible peaks designated in the treaty, positioned such that from any one marker a surveyor could see both the previous and the next markers along the boundary line. This was done so that if ever a question arose about jurisdiction anywhere along the border, a determination could be made by sighting between two markers.

Other peaks named in the treaty but not in the numbered-peak series include T Mountain, in the Stikine Icecap area.  Other peaks on the boundary but not named in the treaty include an unnumbered Boundary Peak in the Icefield Ranges immediately north of the Alsek River and Mount Vern Ritchie, to the north of there.  Mountain passes on the boundary are few, the most important being Grand Pacific, Chilkat, Chilkoot and White Passes.

List of peaks by number

Much of Alaska is included in one of the state's boroughs, and the remainder of the state is divided into census areas.  In the third column, boroughs are marked with daggers† and census areas are marked with asterisks*.

See also
Alaska boundary dispute
Boundary Ranges
List of peaks on the Alberta–British Columbia border

References

Borders of British Columbia
Boundary Ranges
Canada–United States border
International mountains of North America
 
 
 
Saint Elias Mountains
Alaska geography-related lists